Bald Head Creek Boathouse is a historic boathouse located at the mouth of the Cape Fear River at Smith's Island, Brunswick County, North Carolina.  It was built in 1915 by the United States Lighthouse Service.  It is a one-story, side-gabled weathered frame structure.  It sits among salt marshes on wooden pilings.

It was added to the National Register of Historic Places in 1997.

Hurricane Florence destroyed the structure in September 2018. All that remains are the timbers spread across the pilings. This is view-able on Google Maps right across from Boathouse Tract Rd.

References

Government buildings on the National Register of Historic Places in North Carolina
Government buildings completed in 1915
Buildings and structures in Brunswick County, North Carolina
National Register of Historic Places in Brunswick County, North Carolina